Salacia is a genus of plants in the family Celastraceae.  They are woody climbers naturally found in tropical regions.

Several species in this genus have been used in traditional medicine, such as the Ayurvedic system from India.

The chemical constituents of root bark include polyphenols such as salacinol, kotalanol, and mangiferin.

Species
, Plants of the World Online accepts the following species:

Salacia acevedoi 
Salacia adolphi-friderici 
Salacia agasthiamalana 
Salacia alata 
Salacia alveolata 
Salacia alwynii 
Salacia amplectens 
Salacia amplifolia 
Salacia aneityensis 
Salacia annettae 
Salacia arborea 
Salacia arenicola 
Salacia aurantiaca 
Salacia bangalensis 
Salacia beddomei 
Salacia belingana 
Salacia blepharophora 
Salacia brunoniana 
Salacia bussei 
Salacia caillei 
Salacia callensii 
Salacia caloneura 
Salacia capitulata 
Salacia castaneifolia 
Salacia cauliflora 
Salacia cerasifera 
Salacia cerasiformis 
Salacia chinensis 
Salacia chlorantha 
Salacia cochinchinensis 
Salacia columna 
Salacia confertiflora 
Salacia congolensis 
Salacia conraui 
Salacia cordata 
Salacia cornifolia 
Salacia coronata 
Salacia crassifolia 
Salacia cymosa 
Salacia debilis 
Salacia devredii 
Salacia dewevrei 
Salacia diandra 
Salacia dicarpellata 
Salacia dimidia 
Salacia diplasia 
Salacia disepala 
Salacia dongnaiensis 
Salacia ducis-wuertembergiae 
Salacia dusenii 
Salacia ekoka 
Salacia elegans 
Salacia elliptica 
Salacia erecta 
Salacia erythrocarpa 
Salacia euphlebia 
Salacia eurypetala 
Salacia exsculpta 
Salacia ferrifodina 
Salacia fimbrisepala 
Salacia floribunda 
Salacia forsteriana 
Salacia fruticosa 
Salacia frutiplatensis 
Salacia fugax 
Salacia gabunensis 
Salacia gagnepainiana 
Salacia gambleana 
Salacia germainii 
Salacia gerrardii 
Salacia gigantea 
Salacia glaucifolia 
Salacia godefroyana 
Salacia grandiflora 
Salacia grandifolia 
Salacia hainanensis 
Salacia hallei 
Salacia hispida 
Salacia howesii 
Salacia impressifolia 
Salacia insignis 
Salacia intermedia 
Salacia ituriensis 
Salacia jenkinsii 
Salacia juruana 
Salacia kalahiensis 
Salacia kanukuensis 
Salacia khasiana 
Salacia kivuensis 
Salacia klainei 
Salacia korthalsiana 
Salacia kraussii 
Salacia krigsneri 
Salacia laotica 
Salacia lateritia 
Salacia laurentii 
Salacia laurifolia 
Salacia lebrunii 
Salacia ledermannii 
Salacia lehmbachii 
Salacia lenticellosa 
Salacia leptoclada 
Salacia letestui 
Salacia letouzeyana 
Salacia leucoclada 
Salacia loloensis 
Salacia lomensis 
Salacia longipedicellata 
Salacia longipes 
Salacia lovettii 
Salacia lucida 
Salacia luebbertii 
Salacia maburensis 
Salacia macrantha 
Salacia macrocremastra 
Salacia macrophylla 
Salacia macrosperma 
Salacia madagascariensis 
Salacia maingayi 
Salacia majumdarii 
Salacia malabarica 
Salacia malipoensis 
Salacia mamba 
Salacia mannii 
Salacia marginata 
Salacia maudouxii 
Salacia mayumbensis 
Salacia megacarpa 
Salacia megistophylla 
Salacia membranacea 
Salacia menglaensis 
Salacia mennegana 
Salacia miegei 
Salacia minutiflora 
Salacia miqueliana 
Salacia mosenii 
Salacia multiflora 
Salacia myrtifolia 
Salacia ndakala 
Salacia negrensis 
Salacia nemorosa 
Salacia nigra 
Salacia nitida 
Salacia nitidissima 
Salacia noronhioides 
Salacia oblonga 
Salacia oblongifolia 
Salacia obovatilimba 
Salacia odorata 
Salacia oleoides 
Salacia oliveriana 
Salacia opacifolia 
Salacia orientalis 
Salacia ovalis 
Salacia owabiensis 
Salacia pachycarpa 
Salacia pachyphylla 
Salacia pallens 
Salacia pallescens 
Salacia panamensis 
Salacia papuana 
Salacia parkinsonii 
Salacia petenensis 
Salacia phuquocensis 
Salacia pierrei 
Salacia platyphylla 
Salacia polyantha 
Salacia polysperma 
Salacia preussii 
Salacia pueblana 
Salacia pynaertii 
Salacia pyriformioides 
Salacia pyriformis 
Salacia quadrangulata 
Salacia regeliana 
Salacia rehmannii 
Salacia reticulata 
Salacia rhodesiaca 
Salacia rivularis 
Salacia rostrata 
Salacia × rufescens 
Salacia saigonensis 
Salacia salacioides 
Salacia senegalensis 
Salacia sessiliflora 
Salacia smaliana 
Salacia solimoesensis 
Salacia sororia 
Salacia spectabilis 
Salacia staudtiana 
Salacia stuhlmanniana 
Salacia subalternifolia 
Salacia subicterica 
Salacia sulfur 
Salacia talbotii 
Salacia tessmannii 
Salacia togoica 
Salacia tortuosa 
Salacia tuberculata 
Salacia typhina 
Salacia ulei 
Salacia vellaniana 
Salacia venosa 
Salacia vernicosa 
Salacia verrucosa 
Salacia villiersii 
Salacia viminea 
Salacia viridiramis 
Salacia vitiensis 
Salacia volubilis 
Salacia wayanadica 
Salacia wenzelii 
Salacia whytei 
Salacia wrightii 
Salacia zenkeri

References

 
Celastrales genera